The Kiribati Trade Union Congress (KTUC) is the national trade union center of Kiribati. It was formed in 1982. All 7 registered unions in Kiribati are affiliated with the KTUC.

KTUC is affiliated with the International Trade Union Confederation.

References

Trade unions in Kiribati
International Trade Union Confederation
Trade unions established in 1982
1982 establishments in Kiribati